Actinella armitageana is a species of air-breathing land snail, a terrestrial pulmonate gastropod mollusk in the family Geomitridae.

This species is endemic to Portugal.  Its natural habitat is temperate grassland.

References

Molluscs of Madeira
Actinella
Gastropods described in 1852
Taxonomy articles created by Polbot